Among those who were born in the London Borough of Brent, or have dwelt within the borders of the modern borough are (alphabetical order):

Notable residents

Academia and Research
Raymond Gosling – scientist, born in and attended school in Wembley

Arts and Entertainment

Tubby T - Anthony Robinson, 9 September 1974 – 22 May 2008 Most loved artist of 90/00s with hits like “Tales of the hood” 
General Levy – ragga deejay original junglist massive, formative years Harlesden and Wembley
Riz Ahmed – actor, rapper and activist, born in Wembley
Ricardo P Lloyd – actor from Harlesden and who grew up in North-west London
Chizzy Akudolu – actress, born in Harlesden
Lily Allen – singer-songwriter, actress and television presenter, lives in Kensal Green
Gerry Anderson – producer, director and writer, producer of Thunderbirds lived in Kilburn and Neasden, educated at Kingsgate Infants School and Willesden County Grammar School
Tracy-Ann Oberman – actress, Chrissie Watts in EastEnders, born in Brent
Jane Asher – actress, author and entrepreneur, ex-girlfriend of Paul McCartney, born in Willesden
David Baddiel – comedian, novelist and television presenter, educated at North West London Jewish Day School, lived in Dollis Hill.
Doc Brown – rapper, comedian and actor, born in Kilburn, lived in Willesden
Keisha Buchanan – singer-songwriter and member of girl group the Sugababes, born and raised in Kingsbury, attended Kingsbury High School
Mutya Buena – singer-songwriter and member of girl group the Sugababes, born and raised in Kingsbury, attended Kingsbury High School
Grace Carter – singer-songwriter, lives in Kensal Green
Graham Cole – actor, born in Willesden
Lenora Crichlow – actress, born and raised in Harlesden
Diana Churchill – actress, born in Wembley
Daniel Craig – actor, lives in Queen's Park
Sophie Dahl – fashion model and author, lives in Kensal Green
Paloma Faith – singer, lives in Kensal Green
Phil Fearon – record producer and former singer (Galaxy) lived in Harlesden, educated at Willesden High School
Ron Goodwin – composer, 633 Squadron, Those Magnificent Men in Their Flying Machines, film music, Golden Globe nominated, Willesden Grammar School
Tamsin Greig – actress, grew up in Kilburn
Lenny Henry – actor and comedian, lived in Wembley
Mariah Idrissi – model, lives in Wembley Park
Tony Kanal – born and raised in Kingsbury
Maria Lawson – professional R&B singer and X-Factor, 2004 finalist, educated at Queens Park Community School
Arthur Lucan – actor, lived at 11 Forty Lane, Wembley
Annie Mac – DJ and presenter, lives in Queen's Park
George Michael – singer-songwriter, lived in Kingsbury, educated at Kingsbury High School
Sienna Miller – actress, lives in Kensal Green
Keith Moon – drummer, born and lived in Wembley
Cillian Murphy – actor, lives in Queen's Park
Sophie Okonedo – actress, lived in Kenton
Rita Ora – lives in Kensal Green
George the Poet – rapper, born in Neasden
John Neville – actor from Willesden
Thandiwe Newton – lives in Kensal Green
Laura Aikman – actress, born in Brent
Maxine Nightingale – singer from Wembley
Dev Patel – actor, from Sudbury
Rod Price – guitarist from Willesden
Shane Ritchie – actor, comedian, television presenter and singer, attended Willesden High School
Julie Rogers – singer, educated at Kingsbury High School
Gappy Ranks – international musician, artist, Reggae, Dancehall, born Harlesden
Andrew Sachs – actor, lived in Kilburn
Jay Sean – singer-songwriter, born in Harlesden
John Sinclair – keyboardist, born in Wembley
Zadie Smith – novelist, lives in Queen's Park 
Lady Sovereign – rapper, born and lived in Wembley
John Tavener – composer, born in Wembley
David Tress – artist, born in Wembley
Twiggy – model, actress and singer, born in Neasden. Educated at Brondesbury and Kilburn High School
Charles Venn – actor, Ray Dixon in EastEnders, born in Kilburn
Sabrina Washington – singer, lead singer of Mis-Teeq, from Harlesden
Charlie Watts – drummer and member of The Rolling Stones, born in Kingsbury, educated at Kingsbury High School, lived in Wembley
Alfred Willmore - actor, designer, dramatist, writer and impresario born in Willesden 25 October 1899 died Dublin 6 March 1978 better known as Micheal Mac Liammoir. 
Lydia Wilson – actress, born in and lives in Queen's Park

Business and Finance
Jerry Roberts – code breaker and businessman born in Wembley

Journalism and the Media
Louis Theroux – documentary filmmaker and broadcaster, lives in Harlesden
Shaun Wallace – barrister and television personality.

Politics and Government
Luciana Berger – Labour Co-operative MP for Liverpool Wavertree since 2010, from Wembley
Steve Hilton – former director of strategy for Prime Minister David Cameron, lives in Kensal Green.
Mick Whelan – General Secretary of the British trade union ASLEF, lives in Brent.

Sport
Luther Blissett – ex-footballer, lived in Harlesden and educated at Willesden High School
James DeGale – boxer
Jerel Ifil – footballer, born in Wembley
Jacob Murphy – footballer, born in Wembley
Valda Osborn – figure skater, born in Wembley
Matt Sparrow – footballer, born in Wembley
Kieron St Aimie – footballer, born in Wembley
Raheem Sterling – Chelsea F.C. and England national football team footballer, educated at Copland Community School
Jerome Thomas – footballer, born in Wembley
Gary Waddock – footballer, born in Kingsbury, grew up in Alperton.
Ian Wright – ex footballer, lives in Kensal Greeny
Yannick bolasie- former Crystal palace and Everton player,lived in willesden

References

Brent